Lescaillea is a genus of Cuban flowering plants in the tribe Tageteae within the family Asteraceae.

Species
There is only one known species, Lescaillea equisetiformis, native to Cuba.

References

Tageteae
Endemic flora of Cuba
Monotypic Asteraceae genera